Mountain is a 2017 Australian documentary film, co-written, co-produced and directed by Jennifer Peedom. It premiered at the Sydney Opera House in June 2017. Mountain follows Peedom's 2015 documentary film Sherpa.

Synopsis
The film explores high peaks around the world while telling the relationship between humans and mountains across time.

Cast
Willem Dafoe, as the narrator

Adventure sports people:

Alex Honnold
Conrad Anker
Jimmy Chin
Tommy Caldwell
Matt Helliker
Renan Ozturk
Will Gadd
Ricky Bell
Freddie Wilkinson
John Jackson
David Lama
Sean 'Stanley' Leary
Stefan Glowacz
Leo Houlding
Tim Emmett
Jason Pickles
Hilaree O'Neill
Joey Schusler
Mark Landvik
Matt Blank
Pat Moore
Rob Jarman
Sam Seward
Scotty Lago
Tara Kerzhner
Travis Rice
Tyson Swasey
Kurtis Sorge
Jonathan Winter
Karl Thompson
Theo Sanson
Andy Farrington
Candide Thovex
Danny Davis
Darren Berrecloth
Filippo Fabbi
Ian Flanders
Jon Devore

Production
After her critically acclaimed film, Sherpa, Peedom resumes her work with American mountaineer and photographer Renan Ozturk. He is responsible for most of the images in the film. American actor Willem Dafoe narrates the film and reads passages from Robert Macfarlane's book "Mountains of the Mind".

Critical response
On review aggregator Rotten Tomatoes, the film has an approval rating of 84% based on 68 reviews, with an average rating of 7.1/10. The website's critical consensus reads, "Mountain offers a visually thrilling — and surprisingly affecting — look at man's relationship with some of Earth's most imposing natural wonders." On Metacritic, the film has a weighted average score of 82 out of 100, based on 13 critics, indicating "universal acclaim".

Janine Israel from The Guardian gave the film four out of five stars and called it a "masterful documentary". Gayle MacDonald from The Globe and Mail gave the film three out of four stars, praising the visual and musical feature of the film. Harry Windsor from The Hollywood Reporter called it "one of the most visceral essay films ever made" thanks to the musical score and the non-traditional narrative approach, however, he criticised the length of the movie, defining it "slightly overextended".

Accolades
At the 8th AACTA Awards, Mountain won three awards: "Best Cinematography in a Documentary" (Renan Ozturk), "Best Original Music Score in a Documentary" (Richard Tognetti), and "Best Sound in a Documentary" (David White and Robert Mackenzie). The documentary was also nominated for "Best Editing in a Documentary" (Christian Gazal and Scott Gray) and "Best Feature Length Documentary.

Robert Mackenzie was nominated for the "Award for Best Sound" at the 2017 Australian Screen Sound Guild. The film was also nominated for "Best Documentary Feature" at the 2017 Hamptons International Film Festival and "Best Documentary Film (Local or International)" at the 2018 Australian Film Critics Association Awards.

References

External links
 

2017 films
2017 documentary films
Australian documentary films
Avalanches in film
Films about Mount Everest
Mountaineering films
Documentary films about climbing
2010s English-language films
English-language documentary films